Piaszno  is a village in the administrative district of Gmina Tuchomie, within Bytów County, Pomeranian Voivodeship, in northern Poland.

The village has a population of 154.

See also History of Pomerania.

References

Piaszno